Estadio José Arcanjo is a multi-purpose stadium in Olhão, Portugal.  It is currently used mostly for football matches and is the home stadium of Olhanense. The stadium is able to hold 11,622 people and was built in 1984.

Jose Arcanjo
Multi-purpose stadiums in Portugal
S.C. Olhanense
Buildings and structures in Faro District
Sport in Olhão
Sports venues completed in 1984
1984 establishments in Portugal